Darbi Gwynn is an American actress, stunt performer, and singer, known for her role as Marcy in AVH: Alien vs. Hunter, as well for her work as a stunt performer in multiple episodes of CSI: NY.

Biography
Darbi embarked upon her training in piano, voice, (mezzo-soprano) and acting in her adolescent years. Darbi began acting in film with several small roles and soon after was starring in the science fiction film "AVH: Alien vs. Hunter" where she also performed her first stunts. As a working actress she pursued stunt work in both film and television. Darbi Gwynn is a certified Audio Engineer and is currently working on a variety of music projects. She currently DJ's in Los Angeles.

Filmography

Film
 2004 - The Hillz - Couch Girl
 2004 - Tales from Beyond - Ring Girl #2
 2005 - Grace - Gallery Attendee
 2007 - AVH: Alien vs. Hunter - Marcy
 2008 - Frost/Nixon - Photo Mistress with Michael Sheen
 2010 - Columbus Circle - Utility Stunts

Television
 2008-2010 - CSI: NY - Stunts

References

External links
 

21st-century American actresses
American women singers
American film actresses
American television actresses
Actresses from California
Living people
Year of birth missing (living people)